Quid pro quo is a Latin term meaning "something for something".

Quid pro quo may also refer to:

 Quid Pro Quo (film), a 2008 film
 Quid Pro Quo (album), a 2011 album by English rock band Status Quo
 Quid Pro Quo, an album by Australian musician Brett Garsed
 Quid Pro Quo, an album by German medieval rock band In Extremo
 "Quid Pro Quo" (Constantine), an episode of the American television series Constantine
 "Quid Pro Quo", a season 2 episode of Hacks
 "Quid Pro Quoæ (Terriers), an episode of the American television series Terriers
 , Swedish trotter

See also
 "There was no quid pro quo", a phrase employed by Donald Trump in reference to the Trump–Ukraine scandal